Roger Fletcher FRS FRSE (29 January 1939 – 15 July 2016) was a British mathematician and professor at University of Dundee.
He was a Fellow of the Society for Industrial and Applied Mathematics (SIAM) and was elected as a Fellow of the Royal Society in 2003.

In 2006, he won the Lagrange Prize from SIAM. 
In 2008, he was awarded a Royal Medal of the Royal Society of Edinburgh.

See also
 BFGS method
 Davidon–Fletcher–Powell formula
 Nonlinear conjugate gradient method

Bibliography
Practical methods of optimization, Wiley, 1987, ; Wiley, 2000,

References

1939 births
2016 deaths
British mathematicians
Fellows of the Royal Society of Edinburgh
Fellows of the Royal Society
Academics of the University of Dundee